The Chacahoula Swamp Bridge is a twin concrete trestle bridge in the U.S. state of Louisiana. The bridge carries US 90 over the Chacahoula Swamp in Louisiana The bridge was opened in 1995.

See also
List of bridges in the United States
List of longest bridges in the world

References

Bridges completed in 1995
Buildings and structures in Terrebonne Parish, Louisiana
Transportation in Terrebonne Parish, Louisiana
Road bridges in Louisiana
Trestle bridges in the United States
U.S. Route 90
Bridges of the United States Numbered Highway System
Concrete bridges in the United States